The 1927 Rock Island Independents season was their final season in existence. In 1926, the team jumped from the National Football League to the upstart American Football League. When the AFL folded after the 1926 season, the Independents did not rejoin the NFL. They instead played as a minor, semi-pro team in 1927, and then folded. The team posted a 3–1–1 record.

Schedule

References
Pro Football Archives 1927 Rock Island Independents season

Rock Island Independents seasons
1927 in sports in Illinois
Rock Isl